Bilsthorpe Colliery was a colliery in north Nottinghamshire. From when work started in 1925 to the pits closure in 1997, 77 people died at the pit.

History
The pit began in July 1925 with two shafts. The mine was completed in 1928.

On 1 March 1927, fourteen miners were killed. On 26 July 1934, nine miners were killed.

1993 disaster
On 18 August 1993, a roof collapsed killing 26-year old Bill McCulloch (from Rainworth), 50-year-old Peter Alcock and an under-manager, 31-year-old David Shelton (from Blyth). A team from the Mansfield-based Mines Rescue Service searched for survivors.

A 1994 report was produced by the HM Inspectorate of Mines. The disaster was caused by unsafe roof bolting.

Closure
It closed in 1997. A memorial was unveiled in October 2011.

The site is now Bilsthorpe Business park. A new energy centre is planned.

Ownership
On 1 January 1947 it was taken over by the National Coal Board. From 1986 it was run by British Coal.

References

External links
 Safe application of mine roadway support systems
 Memorials
 Photographs
 Mining Atlas

1927 establishments in England
1997 disestablishments in England
1993 mining disasters
1993 disasters in the United Kingdom
Coal mines in Nottinghamshire
Coal mining disasters in England
Underground mines in England
Bilsthorpe